Hileman may refer to:

 Hileman language, a nearly extinct Australian Aboriginal language
 T. J. Hileman (1882–1945), American photographer